Itamar Rabinovich (born 1942) is the president of the Israel Institute (Washington and Jerusalem). He was Israel's Ambassador to the United States in the 1990s and former chief negotiator with Syria between 1993 and 1996, and the former president of Tel Aviv University (1999–2007). Currently he is professor emeritus of Middle Eastern History at Tel Aviv University, distinguished global professor at New York University and a distinguished fellow at the Brookings Institution.

Biography

Itamar Rabinovich received a B.A. degree from the Hebrew University of Jerusalem, an M.A. from Tel Aviv University, and a Ph.D. from the University of California, Los Angeles.

Academic career
Rabinovich has been a member of Tel Aviv University's faculty since 1971, and served as Ettinger Professor of the Contemporary History of the Middle East, chairman of the Department of Middle Eastern Studies, director of the Moshe Dayan Center for Middle Eastern and African Studies, and Dean of Humanities and Rector. He is the president of the Israel Institute (Washington and Jerusalem). He was president of Tel Aviv University (1999–2007) (following Yoram Dinstein, and succeeded by Zvi Galil). 

Currently he is professor emeritus of Middle Eastern History at Tel Aviv University, distinguished global professor at New York University, and a distinguished fellow at the Brookings Institution.

Diplomatic career
He was Israel's Ambassador to the United States in the 1990s and former chief negotiator with Syria between 1993 and 1996.

Published works

Books

Critical studies of his work

Awards and recognition
In 1992, he won the National Jewish Book Award in the Israel category for The Road Not Taken: Early Arab-Israeli Negotiations

He received Commandeur de l'Ordre des Palmes Académiques from France.

Rabinovitch is a member of the American Philosophical Society and the American Academy of Arts and Sciences. He has been awarded the Honorary Grand Golden Cross of the Austrian Republic.

References

External links
  Includes bio of Itamar Rabinovich.
  Bio, papers, events.
 Rabinovich speeches- an official page on the Israeli Embassy website.
 Itamar Rabinovich, Jewish Virtual Library.
 Itamar Rabinovich Kennedy School of Government.
 Itamar Rabinovich, NYU Arts & Science.

 
 Itamar Rabinovich, another mini-bio.

1942 births
Living people
Israeli Jews
Ambassadors of Israel to the United States
People from Jerusalem
Harvard Kennedy School staff
Hebrew University of Jerusalem alumni
Tel Aviv University alumni
Academic staff of Tel Aviv University
University of California, Los Angeles alumni
Camp Rising Sun alumni
Commandeurs of the Ordre des Palmes Académiques
Presidents of universities in Israel
Members of the American Philosophical Society